Portuñol (Spanish spelling) or Portunhol (Portuguese spelling) is a portmanteau of the words portugués/português ("Portuguese") and español/espanhol ("Spanish"), and is the name often given to any non-systematic mixture of Portuguese and Spanish (this sense should not be confused with a mixed language spoken in northern Uruguay by the Brazilian border, known by several names, among them Portuñol). Close examination reveals it to be "a polyvalent term (portuñol/portunhol) used to describe a wide range of phenomena, including spontaneous contact vernaculars in border regions, errors produced by speakers attempting to speak the second language (L2) correctly, and idiosyncratic invented speech designed to facilitate communication between the two languages."

Portuñol/Portunhol is frequently a pidgin, or simplified mixture of the two languages, that allows speakers of either Spanish or Portuguese who are not proficient in the other language to communicate with one another. When speakers of one of the languages attempt to speak the other language, there is often interference from the native language, which causes the phenomenon of code-switching to occur. It is possible to conduct a moderately fluent conversation in this way because Portuguese and Spanish are closely related Romance languages. They have almost identical syntactic structures, as well as overlapping lexicons due to cognates, which means that a single macro-grammar is produced when the two mix. An example for literary effect, "not based on accurate imitations of the speech of border regions", is the phrase en el hueco de la noite longa e langue, illustrating a code-mix of the Spanish article la and the Portuguese noun noite.

Origins
Language contact between Spanish and Portuguese is a result of sustained contact between the two languages in border communities and multilingual trade environments. Such regions include the border regions between Portugal and Spain in the Iberian Peninsula, as well as the ones between Brazil, whose official language is Portuguese, and most of its neighboring countries whose official languages are Spanish. Because Portuñol is a spontaneous register resulting from the occasional mixing of Spanish and Portuguese, it is highly diverse; there is no one dialect or standard of Portuñol. There does, however, tend to be a stronger presence of Spanish in Portuñol.

Contemporary
In recent years, Portuñol has begun to appear in realms other than everyday speech. It has become a literary medium, especially in Argentina, Uruguay and Brazil. Language professor María Jesus Fernández García states that literary registers only occasionally provide a true representation of Portuñol, and that authors often choose to select only some of the features that it is characterized by; she thus describes it as a linguistic recreation of the actual language. One important literary work written in Portuñol is Mar paraguayo by Brazilian author Wilson Bueno. The passage below shows the mixing of Spanish and Portuguese in his novel.

In recent decades, some Portuguese-based creole languages have also become influenced by standard Spanish, notably Annobonese and the Aruban dialect of Papiamento.

The appearance of Portuñol has prompted two opposing opinions or attitudes towards its existence. On the one hand, it is viewed as the product of laziness among speakers unwilling to learn a different language. On the other hand, it is seen as the logical product of globalization. As far as the future of Portuñol is concerned, according to Francisco A. Marcos-Marín, it is too difficult to evaluate possible repercussions that Portuñol could have on future linguistic maps because it is not easy to separate linguistic tendencies that are merely in style and those that are permanent.

Compared to Mirandese 
It is important to note that the colloquial dialect of Portuñol is similar to but different from Mirandese, or "Mirandês" in Portuguese. The Mirandese language is spoken by approximately 15,000 people in northeastern Portugal. The regional language has several similarities to both Portuguese and Spanish languages, but it is a direct descendant of Asturo-Leonese.

Sample texts

See also

Castrapo
Differences between Spanish and Portuguese
Surzhyk
Svorsk
Trasianka

Notes

References

West Iberian languages
Portuguese dialects
Spanish dialects
Languages of Brazil
Code-switching
Languages of Uruguay